Taognathus is an extinct genus of dicynodont, a non-mammalian synapsid. Taognathus lived in South Africa during the Tatarian Age, Lopingian Subepoch, Zechstein Epoch, in the Late Permian, and was named by Scottish South African doctor and paleontologist Robert Broom in 1911. Its diet was herbivorous.

See also

 List of therapsids

References
 Paleofile.com

External links
 The main groups of non-mammalian synapsids at Mikko's Phylogeny Archive

Dicynodonts
Lopingian synapsids of Africa
Fossil taxa described in 1911
Taxa named by Robert Broom
Lopingian genus first appearances
Lopingian genus extinctions